Jonathan Pérez (born 18 June 1987 in Clamart) is a footballer, who currently plays for SO Chambéry Foot.

Career
He has played in Ligue 2 for Troyes AC before joining SO Chambéry Foot in July 2009.

Notes

1987 births
Living people
People from Clamart
French footballers
ES Troyes AC players

Association football midfielders
Chambéry SF players
Footballers from Hauts-de-Seine